This is a survey of the postage stamps and postal history of the Netherlands.

The postal region of the Netherlands is located in North-West Europe and comprises the whole territory of the Kingdom of the Netherlands in Europe and until 2010 the full territory of the country the Netherlands. Four other postal regions exist in the kingdom: for Aruba, the Caribbean Netherlands (Bonaire, Sint Eustatius and Saba), Curaçao and Sint Maarten.

First stamps 
The first stamps of the Netherlands were issued in 1852 and depicted King William III.

1931 stamps

Second World War 
During the Second World War the Netherlands were occupied by Germany. Stamp issues continued and a number of semi-postal stamps were issued.

Post-war 
The Netherlands were liberated on 5 May 1945. The previous stamps continued in use until a new series was introduced on 1 April 1946. This series contained stamps originally issued by the Dutch Government in Exile in Britain in 1944 for use on ships of the Dutch Navy serving with the Allies.

Regular stamp issues have continued since then including several long-running definitive stamp series, numerous commemorative stamps and the regular issue of semi-postal stamps for charitable causes which has become a notable feature of Dutch philately.

Provincial stamps 
In 2002 a series of 12 provincial stamps were issued. Whilst not strictly local stamps, as they were valid throughout the Netherlands, the stamps were only available to purchase from post offices in the relevant province or from the Dutch Philatelic Bureau.

Variable value stamps 
Variable value stamps have been issued in the Netherlands since 1989.

Stamp booklets 
The Dutch Post Office has been an enthusiastic issuer of postage stamp booklets, issuing over 150 since the first one in 1902.

International Court of Justice 
A number of stamps have been issued since 1934 for use at the International Court of Justice in The Hague.

See also 
KNBF Bondsbibliotheek, a philatelic library of the 
List of people on stamps of the Netherlands
Postage stamps and postal history of Aruba
Postage stamps and postal history of the Caribbean Netherlands
Postage stamps and postal history of Curaçao
Postage stamps and postal history of the Netherlands Antilles
Postage stamps and postal history of the Netherlands East Indies
Postage stamps and postal history of Sint Maarten
Postage stamps and postal history of Suriname
Koninklijke TNT Post
PostNL

References

Further reading 
Melville, Fred. Holland. (The Melville Stamp Books.) 1909.

External links 

 American Society for Netherlands Philately.
 The Netherlands Philatelic Circle (UK)

Postal system of the Netherlands
Philately of the Netherlands